Juan Carlos Pugliese (1915–1994) was an Argentine politician. He served as minister of interior and minister of economy during the presidency of Raúl Alfonsín.

References

|-

|-

|-

Ministers of Internal Affairs of Argentina
Argentine Ministers of Finance
Radical Civic Union politicians
1915 births
1994 deaths
Presidents of the Argentine Chamber of Deputies
Members of the Argentine Chamber of Deputies elected in Buenos Aires